Los Aleros is a theme park located near Mérida, Venezuela. It depicts a typical Andean town in the 1930s.  It was created by Alexis Montilla in 1984; he subsequently created the nearby "Venezuela de Antier" and "Montaña de los Sueños" themeparks.

References

External links

Amusement parks in Venezuela
Buildings and structures in Mérida (state)
Tourist attractions in Mérida (state)